G.I. Joe: A Real American Hero (retitled Action Force in the United Kingdom) is a half-hour American animated television series created by Ron Friedman. Based on the toyline from Hasbro, the cartoon ran in syndication from 1983 to 1986. 95 episodes were produced.

History

When Hasbro launched the G.I. Joe: A Real American Hero toyline in 1982 alongside the Marvel Comics series, it commissioned Marvel Productions to produce a series of fully animated 30-second television commercials which were broadcast in order to promote the comic book publication, since advertising regulations for a literary work were more lax than for a direct toy commercial. The commercial for the first issue began airing throughout the Spring of 1982. The popularity of these commercials led to the production of a five-part G.I. Joe mini-series which aired in 1983 (later known as "The M.A.S.S. Device" when it re-aired during the series' syndication). 

The plot centers on the titular M.A.S.S. Device, a powerful matter-transporter, and G.I. Joe and Cobra's race around the world to acquire the three catalytic elements which power the machine. A second five-part mini-series followed in 1984, G.I. Joe: The Revenge of Cobra (titled "The Weather Dominator" in later airings), with a similar plot that involved the Joes and Cobras traveling around the world to recover the scattered fragments of Cobra's new weather-controlling weapon, the Weather Dominator. Both mini-series were written by Ron Friedman.

G.I. Joe was promoted to a full series in 1985, with an initial order for a first season of 55 more episodes (in order to make up the required 65 episodes for syndication). This season began with a third Friedman-penned five-part adventure, "The Pyramid of Darkness"; the story sees most of the existing cast from the two previous mini-series held captive by Cobra, while a new assortment of characters (that is, the new 1985 range of toys) thwart Cobra's attempts to surround the Earth with the electricity-negating Pyramid of Darkness. Both the new and old characters then shared the spotlight throughout the course of the remaining fifty episodes of the series, which were primarily stand-alone single-episode adventures, with the occasional two-part story. The season was story edited by Steve Gerber.

A second season of 30 episodes followed in 1986, beginning with a fourth five-part story, "Arise, Serpentor, Arise!" in which Cobra scientist Doctor Mindbender, inspired by a recurring dream, uses the DNA of history's most ruthless conquerors and rulers to genetically engineer Serpentor, who usurps Cobra Commander's leadership of Cobra. This mini-series introduced the new 1986 range of toys into the story, which were at the center of most stories across the rest of the season; in particular, the mini-series debuted former WWF and then-current AWA professional wrestler Sgt. Slaughter as a member of G.I. Joe, played by himself. For this season, Buzz Dixon replaced Steve Gerber as story editor.

Film

G.I. Joe: The Movie, a feature-length film version of the series, was intended to be released theatrically, followed by the release of The Transformers: The Movie. However, the movie encountered unexpected production delays which allowed the Transformers feature to be released first. Due to the poor box office performances of the Transformers and My Little Pony films, G.I. Joe was relegated to direct-to-video status. It was released on VHS on April 20, 1987, and was later split into a five-part mini-series for television syndication.

The movie follows up on the events of Season 2, revealing that Cobra Commander is actually an agent of a secret civilization known as Cobra-La led by a half-serpent being named Golobulus. The same organization is also revealed to have had a hand in the creation of Serpentor, as the dream that inspired Doctor Mindbender to create him is revealed to be a subconscious suggestion that was implanted into his mind by one of Golobulus' bugs called the Psychic Motivator. In addition to Cobra-La, two new sub-teams were introduced within the Joe Team, the Rawhides and the Renegades, both of which were composed of characters which were introduced into the toyline during its 1987 lineup.

Cancellation
Marvel Productions continued to produce animated commercials for the toyline and comic books (which featured a new theme song with the lyrics "Nobody Beats G.I. Joe") after the broadcast of G.I. Joe: The Movie, which was intended to set up Season 3. However, the company never got around to producing a third season, ending up losing its license to the competing animation company DiC during pre-production. Michael Charles Hill, who wrote several episodes of the show, had already proposed an outline for Season 3 that would have followed the events of The Movie. In this unmade third season, a criminal organization named "The Coil", which is composed of a group of former Cobra elites who are led by Tomax and Xamot, would have served as the new enemy faction, while a mutated Cobra Commander would have tried to secretly rebuild his organization after the destruction of Cobra-La, shifting allegiance between the Coil and the Joes in order to further his own ambitions.

Subsequent series
A second G.I. Joe: A Real American Hero series was produced by DIC Entertainment that ran from 1989 to 1991. It premiered with a five-part mini-series which was titled "Operation: Dragonfire," lasted two seasons, and consisted of a total of 44 episodes. The DiC series served as a continuation of the Sunbow series, but it did not use the aforementioned season 3 pitch.

Sunbow would later return to the G.I. Joe franchise, co-producing the 1994 straight-to-video animated pilot Sgt. Savage and his Screaming Eagles and the G.I. Joe Extreme TV series, which aired from 1995 to 1996. The Screaming Eagles pilot featured appearances by characters from the A Real American Hero series (namely Hawk, Doc, Lady Jaye, and Cobra Commander) in supporting roles, but its primary focus was on new heroes and villains.

Production

G.I. Joe was a co-production between Marvel Productions and Sunbow Productions. Sunbow's staff would write the scripts based on the character and vehicle designs provided by Hasbro, while the artists at Marvel Productions would draw storyboards based on the scripts and record voiceovers. The animation was outsourced to Toei in Japan, who worked on all 95 episodes, as well as the movie.

The G.I. Joe comics and animated series share a few common plot elements that were not products of the toyline at the time such as the town of Springfield, the Oktober Guard and the character of The Baroness (who was only introduced into the toyline in 1984). However, they did not share the same continuity and as a result, they differed significantly in terms of how the characters were written and the direction the stories took (particularly regarding the nature of Cobra Commander's true identity).

In contrast to the comics (in which non-toyline characters such as G.I. Joe commanding officer General Flagg and Cobra scientist Dr. Venom, were killed off early during its run), the TV series had to adhere to children's programming regulations and as a result none of the characters were allowed to use actual firearms and nobody was ever killed on-screen. Instead, characters used laser guns to fight their battles (which were color-coded for each side, red for the Joes and blue for Cobra) and whenever a vehicle was destroyed on-screen, the pilot or driver would often be shown exiting from it or parachuting before the destruction. 

However, the show was still allowed to make references to off-screen casualties, as the term could be used interchangeably for injuries and deaths. One particular episode in Season 1, a two-parter titled "Worlds Without End" in which the Joes are transported to an alternate universe where the Joes have been defeated by Cobra, features a scene in which three members of the Joe Team (Steeler, Grunt and Clutch) find the skeletal remains of their counterparts from that world (the second part of the episode ends with the aforementioned characters deciding to remain in the alternate universe and replace their deceased counterparts).

A public safety lesson was usually featured at the end of each episode, using G.I. Joe characters in brief scenarios to impart safety tips to children. These lessons gave birth to the catchphrase, "Now we know!", and the response, "And knowing is half the battle".

In each episode's opening title sequence voice actor Jackson Beck states that, "G.I. Joe is the code name for America's daring, highly-trained, Special Mission force. Its purpose: To defend human freedom against Cobra, a ruthless terrorist organization determined to rule the world".

Because the series was produced as a vehicle to sell the toys, most of the episodes would focus on the newest characters being sold in stores at the time, while older characters would fall by the wayside as they were being phased out from the toyline. Most notably Hawk, who was part of the 1982 launch lineup and the original G.I. Joe leader in the Marvel comics, was absent during the entirety of Season 1 in favor of having Duke (a character introduced in 1983, the year when the first miniseries aired) serve as the leader instead. When Hawk was reintroduced to the toyline with a new action figure in 1986, the character was suddenly part of the team in Season 2 as Duke's superior and the head of G.I. Joe's chain of command with no explanation for his absence in the prior season.

Cast
 Charlie Adler - Low-Light
 Jack Angel - Wet Suit, Viper, Thunder (in "The Most Dangerous Thing in the World")
 Libby Aubrey - Cover Girl
 Jackson Beck - Narrator
 Michael Bell - Blowtorch, Clutch, Duke, Lift-Ticket, Major Bludd, Scrap-Iron, Tollbooth, Xamot, Cobra Trooper, Viper, Tele-Viper
 Gregg Berger - Colonel Brekhov, Cutter, Firefly, Rip Cord, Sparks, Spirit
 Arthur Burghardt - Destro, Iceberg, Stalker, Cobra Trooper
 Corey Burton - Tomax, Wild Weasel, Lt. Clay Moore
 William Callaway - Beach Head
 François Chau - Quick Kick
 Peter Cullen - Airborne, Zandar, Cobra Trooper
 Brian Cummings - Doctor Mindbender
 Pat Fraley - Ace, Airtight, Wild Weasel, Cobra Trooper
 Hank Garrett - Dial Tone
 Dick Gautier - Serpentor
 Ed Gilbert - General Hawk
 Dan Gilvezan - Slip Stream, Beach Head (in "Let's Play Soldier")
 Zack Hoffman - Zartan
 Kene Holliday - Roadblock
 John Hostetter - Bazooka 
 Jerry Houser - Sci-Fi
 Milton James - Zandar (Arise, Serpentor, Arise! Part 5)
 Buster Jones - Doc, Zap, Cobra Trooper
 Chris Latta - Breaker, Cobra Commander, Frostbite, Gung-Ho, Ripper, Steeler, Tele-Viper
 Loren Lester - Barbecue
 Morgan Lofting - Baroness
 Chuck McCann - Leatherneck
 Michael McConnohie - Cross-Country
 Mary McDonald-Lewis - Lady Jaye
 Bill Morey - Mutt, Recondo
 Rob Paulsen - Snow Job, Tripwire, Flash
 Patrick Pinney - Mainframe
 Lisa Raggio - Zarana
 Bill Ratner - Flint, Cobra Trooper, Strato-Viper
 Hal Rayle - Deep Six
 Bob Remus - Sgt. Slaughter
 Neil Ross - Buzzer, Dusty, Heavy Metal, Monkeywrench, Shipwreck, Thunder
 Dan Roth - Grunt
 Will Ryan - Footloose, Rock 'n Roll
 Ted Schwartz - Thrasher
 John Stephenson - General Flagg, General Hawk (in "The Spy Who Rooked Me" and a single spoken line in "My Favorite Things")
 B.J. Ward - Scarlett
 Lee Weaver - Alpine
 Frank Welker - Copperhead, Flash, Freedom, Horrorshow, Junkyard, Polly, Short-Fuse, Timber, Torch, Wild-Bill, Rock 'n Roll, Cobra Trooper, Tele-Viper
 Stan Wojno - Lifeline
 Michael Yama - Torpedo
Keone Young - Storm Shadow

Crew
 Wally Burr - Voice Director
 Junichi Hayama - In between Animation
 Don Jurwich - Voice Director
 Russ Heath - Model Design
 Bruce Timm - Model Design (Season 1)

Home media

VHS, Betamax and LaserDisc
Various episodes were released on home video by Family Home Entertainment in North America. A total of 12 numbered volumes were produced on VHS and Betamax from 1984 to 1986. Vol. 1 and 2 featured the first two mini-series, "The M.A.S.S. Device" and "The Revenge of Cobra" respectively, edited as feature-length movies, while Vol. 3 through 11 featured a single episode each from the first season. These tapes were originally released in clamshell cases packaged in large boxes and were subsequently reissued with standard cardboard sleeves. Vol. 12 contains three episodes, each preceded by a live-action introduction hosted by Sgt. Slaughter, although certain versions of this volume only contains two episodes. All 12 volumes featured comic book-like packaging artwork. The "Arise Serpentor, Arise" mini-series was later released as an edited feature-length movie on VHS and LaserDisc in 1991, making it the sole G.I. Joe release in the latter media format.

Rhino Home Video would later acquire the home video rights to the series and release a second series of VHS tapes under their "Kid Rhino" branding. Nine volumes were released for general retail between 1999 and 2000, each containing two episodes (including two-part episodes). A tenth volume was released in 2001 as part of Blockbuster Video's exclusive "Kidmongous" series, which contained four episodes.

Outside North America, episodes of G.I. Joe were also released on VHS in other countries by various local companies, with the Action Force version of the show receiving a total of 27 VHS releases in the United Kingdom.

DVD
In 2003-2004, Kid Rhino Entertainment (a subsidiary of AOL Time Warner) (a Warner Family Entertainment and WEA/Warner Music Group-distributed label) began releasing G.I. Joe: A Real American Hero on DVD in Region 1. They released the original two mini-series in 2003 followed by Season 1 in 2 volume sets in 2004. The first half of Season 2 was released in late 2004 but the remaining episodes were never released due to quality issues when the original DVDs were released (such as adding more sound effects when watched in 5.1 surround sound, since they did the same to the Transformers G1 DVD sets, also done by Rhino). These DVD sets have since gone out of print as Rhino lost the distribution rights.

In 2008, Hasbro reacquired the worldwide distribution rights to the Sunbow library which includes G.I. Joe. During 2008 and 2009, Hasbro released five gift packs of cartoon-inspired action figures, each including a DVD. The first four sets included the four miniseries, and the fifth an assortment of Sunbow series episodes.

In March 2009, Shout! Factory acquired the rights to re-release G.I. Joe on DVD in Region 1 with Vivendi Entertainment. They have subsequently released Season 1 in 3 volume sets. On July 22, 2009, they released G.I. Joe - A Real American Hero: Complete Collector's Set, a 17-disc boxset featuring all 95 episodes and extensive bonus features including archival Hasbro toy commercials and a collectible 60-page book. The second and final season was released as a stand-alone set on April 27, 2010. This series is available for streaming on Hasbro's own channel on Youtube dedicating to this series; as well as it's available on the Tubi streaming service.

UK VHS releases
 St. Michael Video (1987)
 Tempo Video (MSD Video, Tempo Super Video Then: Tempo Kids Club) (1987–1992)
 Collins Video (1989)

Reception
In January 2009, IGN ranked G.I. Joe as number 19 on its list of the Top 100 Animated Series.

See also

 Fensler Films

Notes

References

External links
  (1st mini-series)
  (2nd mini-series)
 
 G.I. Joe: A Real American Hero at Retrojunk.com
 G.I. Joe (Sunbow) at YOJOE.com

1980s American animated television series
1980s American science fiction television series
1983 American television series debuts
1986 American television series endings
American children's animated action television series
American children's animated adventure television series
American children's animated science fantasy television series
Animated television series based on Marvel Comics
English-language television shows
First-run syndicated television programs in the United States
G.I. Joe television series
Ninja fiction
Television series by Claster Television
Television series by Hasbro Studios
Television series by Marvel Productions
Television series by Sunbow Entertainment
Toei Animation television
Toonami